Osan–Hwaseong Expressway (part of Expressway 171) is an expressway in South Korea that runs between Osan and Hwaseong. Established on October 29, 2009, it is the shortest expressway in South Korea with a length of 2.55 kilometers (1.58 miles). It shares its expressway number with Yongin-Seoul Expressway. However, they are not connected.

History 

On January 3, 2008, the name was changed from Pyeongtaek-Hwaseong Expressway to Expressway No. 171 Osan–Hwaseong Expressway. On October 29, 2009, all routes were started through the West Osan Junction- Annyeong Tollgate.

Features 

Lanes: 6
Length: 2.55 Km (1.58 miles)
Speed limit: 100 km/hr

List of facilities 

 IC: Interchange, JC: Junction, SA: Service Area, TG: Tollgate

References

External links 
 Gyeonggi Expressway

Expressways in South Korea
Roads in Gyeonggi